CAWS or Caws may refer to:

 Caws (surname), a list of people with the name
 Central aural warning system, a voice warning system on McDonnell Douglas aircraft and the Boeing 717
 Chicago Area Water System, administered by the Metropolitan Water Reclamation District of Greater Chicago
 Common Arrangement of Work Sections, a construction industry working convention in the UK
 Continuous Automatic Warning System, a cab signalling and train protection system used in Ireland 
 AAI CAWS, a Close Assault Weapon System
 Heckler & Koch HK CAWS, a Close Assault Weapon System

See also
 CAW (disambiguation)
 Cause